Philodromus laticeps is a species of running crab spider in the family Philodromidae. It is found in the United States.

References

laticeps
Articles created by Qbugbot
Spiders described in 1880